The 2020 PDC Unicorn World Youth Championship was the tenth edition of the PDC World Youth Championship, a tournament organised by the Professional Darts Corporation for darts players aged between 16 and 23.

The group stage and knock-out phase from the last 32 to the semi-finals were played at Metrodome, Barnsley, on 28 September 2020. The final took place on 29 November 2020 at the Ricoh Arena, Coventry, before the final of the 2020 Players Championship Finals.

England's Luke Humphries was the reigning champion after defeating Adam Gawlas of the Czech Republic 6–0 in the 2019 final, but he was unable to defend his title, as he was over the age limit.

England's Bradley Brooks won the title after defeating compatriot Joe Davis 6–5 in the final.

Prize money

Qualifiers
The field of 96 players is made of PDC Tour Card Holders, Development Tour players and International Qualifiers. All entrants ranked on the PDC Order of Merit were seeded first, with the top players on the Development Tour Order of Merit following up to 32 seeds. The numbers of International Qualifiers were significantly reduced due to the disruption caused by the COVID-19 pandemic.

PDC Order of Merit Qualifiers:
  Jeffrey de Zwaan 
  Martin Schindler 
  Harry Ward 
  Ted Evetts 
  Geert Nentjes 
  Niels Zonneveld 
  William Borland 
  Callan Rydz 
  Ryan Meikle 
  Bradley Brooks 
  Jitse van der Wal 
  Lewy Williams 
  Brian Raman 
  Nathan Rafferty 
  Dom Taylor 
  Kevin Doets 
  Maikel Verberk 

Development Tour Qualifiers:

International qualifiers:

  Sean Negrette
  Nathan Potter
  Man Lok Leung

Draw

Group stage

Group 1

Group 2

Group 3

Group 4

Group 5

Group 6

Group 7

Group 8

Group 9

Group 10

Group 11

Group 12

Group 13

Group 14

Group 15

Group 16

Group 17

Group 18

Group 19

Group 20

Group 21

Group 22

Group 23

Group 24

Group 25

Group 26

Group 27

Group 28

Group 29

Group 30

Group 31

Group 32

Knockout Phase

References

World Youth Championship
PDC World Youth Championship
PDC World Youth Championship
2020
PDC World Youth Championship
PDC World Youth Championship